Edgar Leonardo Martínez Fracchia (born January 26, 1979 in Montevideo), commonly known as Edgar Martínez, is a retired  Uruguayan footballer who played as a centre back.

References

External links
  
 Edgar Martínez at playmakerstats.com (English version of ceroacero.es)

1979 births
Living people
Footballers from Montevideo
Association football defenders
Uruguayan footballers
Uruguayan expatriate footballers
Chinese Super League players
Liga Nacional de Fútbol de Guatemala players
Uruguayan Segunda División players
Uruguayan Primera División players
Rampla Juniors players
Montevideo Wanderers F.C. players
Chongqing Liangjiang Athletic F.C. players
Tacuarembó F.C. players
Central Español players
Comunicaciones F.C. players
Sud América players
Expatriate footballers in China
Expatriate footballers in Costa Rica
Expatriate footballers in Guatemala
Expatriate soccer players in the United States
Uruguayan expatriate sportspeople in China
Uruguayan expatriate sportspeople in Guatemala
Uruguayan expatriate sportspeople in the United States
Rampla Juniors managers